The Civic Tower was built in the Italian city of Pavia in the 11th century, next to Pavia Cathedral.

Between 1583 and 1585 the architect Pellegrino Tibaldi led works to add a room at the top of the tower to house the cathedral's bells, which it did until it was moved to a campanile of the cathedral.

On 17 March 1989, at 8:55a.m., the Civic Tower collapsed, leaving  of brick, sand and granite rubble. The collapse killed four people and injured fifteen. It has not been rebuilt, though some elements from it are now on display at the city's Castello Visconteo.

After the tower's collapse, the Italian government closed the Leaning Tower of Pisa on 7 January 1990 over concerns that the popular tourist site might also be at risk of collapse.

References

External links 

 Blog with photograph of the structure before its collapse

Buildings and structures in Pavia
Buildings and structures completed in 1585
Collapsed buildings and structures
Former buildings and structures in Italy
Former towers